Jonathan Charles Slinger (born 15 August 1972) is an English actor.

Slinger was born in Accrington, Lancashire.  He trained at RADA, graduating in 1994. From there, he went to work at the Royal National Theatre and Shakespeare's Globe. He has also worked extensively with the Royal Shakespeare Company, including the Complete Works and This England: The Histories cycles, playing Richard II, Fluellen, Richard Duke of York and Richard III. He played Bernard Woolley, the Prime Minister's Principal Private Secretary, in the stage version of Yes, Prime Minister (Chichester/London, 2010). In 2011, he appeared again with the Royal Shakespeare Company in the title role of Macbeth, a new production by Michael Boyd which was the first Shakespeare play to appear in the revamped Royal Shakespeare Theatre. In 2012 he played Malvolio and Prospero for the RSC in London and Stratford, and in 2013 he played Hamlet. In May 2015, he started playing Willy Wonka in Charlie and the Chocolate Factory in London at Theatre Royal Drury Lane.

Partial filmography
 The Last September (1999) as Laurence Carstairs
 Forgive and Forget (TV - 2000) as Carl
 A Knight's Tale (2001) as Peter the Pardoner
 Ladies and Gentleman (TV - 2007) as Mr. Lupton
 The Adventures of Daniel (2010) as Mr. Wallace
 A Thousand Kisses Deep (2011) as Doug Selva
 Still (2014) as Ed
 Bait (2014) as Jeremy
 The Salisbury Poisonings (2020) as Professor Tim Atkins
 Xenoblade Chronicles 3 (2022) as Consul D (voice)

References

External links

1972 births
People from Accrington
Living people
English male stage actors
Alumni of RADA
20th-century English male actors
21st-century English male actors
Male actors from Lancashire
Royal Shakespeare Company members